Korolivka may refer to several places in Ukraine:

 Korolivka, Makariv Raion, village in Makariv Raion, Kyiv Oblast
 Korolivka, Brody Raion, village in Brody Raion
 Korolivka, Borshchiv urban hromada, Chortkiv Raion, Ternopil Oblast, village in Chortkiv Raion
 Korolivka, Zalishchyky Raion, village in the Zalishchyky Raion